Salle Ibn Yassine is an indoor sporting arena located in Rabat, Morocco.  The capacity of the arena is 5,000 people.

Indoor arenas in Morocco
S
Sport in Rabat